Pulau Tawar is a mukim in Jerantut District, Pahang, Malaysia. It is situated on the banks of Sungai Pahang River.

Traditional Villages
 Kampung Perian
 Kampung Bukit Rang
 Kampung Pulau Tawar Baru (Bukit Rang 2
 Kampung Kedondong
 Kampung Masjid
 Kampung Kubang Sekendal
 Kampung Bandar
 Kampung Teluk
 Kampung Merbau
 Kampung Sungai Siam
 Kampung Sungai Tekam
 Kampung Perak

Felda

 Jengka 8
 Jengka 9
 Jengka 24
 Kota Gelanggi 1
 Kota Gelanggi 2
 Kota Gelanggi 3
 Kota Gelanggi 4
 Gugusan Lepar
 Sungai Tekam Utara
 Sungai Tekam Getah

Genealogy of Pulau Tawar Family
Salasilah Keluarga Pulau Tawar

Jerantut District
Mukims of Pahang